Yuri Vladimirovich Doroshenko (born 30 August 1980) is a former Russian professional football player. He also holds Ukrainian citizenship as Yuriy Volodymyrovych Doroshenko.

Club career
He played 3 seasons in the Russian Football National League for FC Arsenal Tula, FC KAMAZ Naberezhnye Chelny and FC Oryol.

See also
Football in Russia
List of football clubs in Russia

References

External links
 

1980 births
Ukrainian emigrants to Russia
Living people
Russian footballers
Association football forwards
FC Dynamo-2 Kyiv players
FC Dynamo-3 Kyiv players
PFC Sumy players
FC Obolon-Brovar Kyiv players
FC Obolon-2 Kyiv players
FC Arsenal Tula players
FC Metallurg Lipetsk players
FC Khimik-Arsenal players
FC KAMAZ Naberezhnye Chelny players
FC Oryol players
FC Volga Nizhny Novgorod players
FC Nizhny Novgorod (2007) players
FC Lukhovitsy players
FC Spartak-MZhK Ryazan players